The third Isle of Man Tourist Trophy motorcycle race was held on Thursday, September 23, 1909 at the St John's Short Course, Isle of Man. The race was ten laps of the 15 mile 1,430 yards course, a total race distance of 158.125 miles. There was no limit on fuel consumption and the singles and twins, limited to 500 and 750cc respectively, ran together. The men were sent off in pairs at half-minute intervals. Giosue Giuppone became the first Italian rider to finish the race twelfth place on a new 84x86mm (476cc) Peugeot. Ernesto Gnesa had taken part of 1908 Isle of Man TT a year before, retirering on the first lap.

500 Single & 750 Twin Results Open Class Race
Thursday 23 September 1909 – 10 laps (158 ⅛ miles) St. John's Short Course.

Sources

External links
 Detailed race results
 Mountain Course map

1909 in motorsport
1909
Isle